TogliattiAzot is a Russian chemical company that has been described as the world's largest ammonia producer. It is headquartered in Tolyatti, Russia.

The main ammonia plant in Tolyatti was constructed as a joint project of the Soviet Government and Armand Hammer. TogliattiAzot started operations in 1979. The Tolyatti-Odessa ammonia pipeline, the longest ammonia pipeline in the world, is operated by Transammiak. A marine ammonia terminal is under construction at Port Taman near Taman, Russia.

Following the severe financial difficulties experienced during the past 10 years by the city's other major employer, AvtoVAZ, TogliattiAzot has been responsible for providing most of the services and social programs to Tolyatti, a city of 720,000 inhabitants.

TogliattiAzot is one of the largest taxpayers in the Samara region.

History 
Construction on the first TogliattiAzot nitrogen plant commenced in 1974. The factory and plant were commissioned as part of a joint venture between Occidental Petroleum and the Soviet Government. The 1970s saw the construction of the Togliatti-Odessa ammonia pipeline which stretches for 2,471 km right into the Port of Odessa.

In August 1983, the company produced the first shipment of liquid carbon nitrogen. In 1985 the first urea-formaldehyde resin production unit was commissioned. Four of the seven current ammonia plants at Tolyatti were constructed by Chemico.

During the 1980s, two urea processing plants were constructed with a combined production capacity of 480,000 tons per year.

In 2012 TogliattiAzot announced the start of major modernization project. The eight-year modernization plan includes a “major renovation” of existing facilities and upgraded manufacturing. The plan also includes the upgrade of 7 existing ammonia plants, air compressors, and the replacement of the reaction tubes and heat exchangers.

Management
Vladimir Makhlai was appointed TogliattiAzot's director general in 1985.
Following TogliattiAzot's privatization in 1992, the company was managed by members of Makhlai family and their appointees.

Vladimir Makhlai bought 20% of the company during perestroika and gradually increased his shareholding to a controlling stake at the end of the 1990s.

Sergei Makhlai took over the Chairman of the Board position from his father, Vladimir Makhlai in 2011 and remains in that position as in September 2015.

In the corporate structure put in place by TogliattiAzot's shareholders, the role of TogliattiAzot's CEO is assigned to its management company, TogliattiAzot Corporation, which is under the same control as the company itself.

TogliattiAzot Corporation's CEO is Vyacheslav Suslov, who replaced the company's long standing CEO Eugeny Korolev in January 2015.

Shareholder (Corporate) Conflicts 
Since the late-1990s TogliattiAzot has been selling its produce in the international markets primarily through Nitrochem Distribution, a Swiss trading company owned by Ameropa Holding AG, a Swiss trader.

The partnership between Nitrochem and TogliattiAzot has existed since the mid-1990s and has undergone numerous audits by regulatory and law enforcement agencies. The independent industry experts who conducted these audits have confirmed that – based on the details and circumstances of TogliattiAzot's activities and products, most of which are exported through the Tolyatti-Odessa pipeline – the company's export prices do comply with market rates. Judicial investigations have found no affiliation has been found between TogliattiAzot's management or major shareholders and Nitrochem Distribution AG: TogliattiAzot has stated that all its export activities fully comply with Russian legislation, and that its partnership with a western trader is a standard practice adopted for commercial convenience.

The shareholder conflict instigated by Uralchem has been deemed a corporate raiding attack against TogliattiAzot. It is not the first legal case against the company: according to TogliattiAzot's lawyer "Such a claim has already occurred, it wound up on criminal charges, which were then dropped due to lack of corpus delicti".

In December 2021, after the 10 year corporate conflict, Federal Antimonopoly Service approved the purchase of 83,731% of shares of TogliattiAzot by JSC "Khimaktivinvest", controlled by Dmitry Mazepin, Uralchem owner. Thus, "Khimaktivinvest" is able to control 93,723% of TogliattiAzot.

Hereafter in January 2022, Oleg Egerev, trustee of Sergey Makhlai, announced the sale of 38,7% of shares for 31 billion roubles within S.Makhlai`s bankruptcy case. Since July 2019, movables and immovables of TogliattiAzot are arrested by decision of the Court of Komsomolsky district in the case of fraud against Vladimir Makhlai, Sergey Makhlai, Evgeny Korolev and their Swiss partners Andreas Zivy and Beat Ruprecht.

TogliattiAzot Pipeline 
The world's longest ammonia pipeline runs from TogliattiAzot's plant in Russia to Odessa in Ukraine. The 'Tolyatti  Odessa' pipeline, through which TogliattiAzot exports ammonia, was finished in 1981.

In 2015, the company received the approvals needed for the construction and launch of a deep sea ammonia and urea transshipment complex in the Taman Seaport, Krasnodar Region. The completion date for the first terminal is scheduled for 2017, and operational commissioning for the second terminal is scheduled for 2020.

Products

Agricultural Products 
 Ammonia  TogliattiAzot produces up to 3 million tons of ammonia per year. In 1993, ammonia unit AM 76 was fully automated by Honeywell, and again in late 2015. In 2001, the European Bank for Reconstruction and Development approved a loan for $40 million for expansion of ammonia production.
 Liquid Ammonia  TogliattiAzot's total output of liquid ammonia in 2014 was 2.9 million tons. In 2015, Houston based KBR Inc. was awarded a contract to revamp the existing seven ammonia plants in Tolyatti.
 Urea  The construction of a new Urea plant was commissioned by TogliattiAzot in 2015.

Materials Science 
 Urea Formaldehyde Concentrate (UFC)  The development of Urea Formaldehyde Concentrate (UFC) was patented by TogliattiAzot in 1998. The company produces two grades of UFC: a processing granular nitrogen, and a resin base at the company's factory at Sheksninsky. In 2006, TogliattiAzot opened a 25,000 tonne UFC facility bringing production capacity to around 40,000 tonnes.
 Carbonic Acid  Togliattizot runs a process plant for the production of liquid carbonic acid and the processing of ammonia waste.
 Basalt Fiber and Film  High-strength basalt fiber is produced and utilized by TogliattiAzot at all its plants. The basalt fiber is used as a non-flammable thermal insulator.
 Ceramic Production  TogliattiAzot runs a successful brick making factory in Toylatti reported to produce in excess of 60 million bricks per year.
 Consumer Goods  TogliattiAzot owns a consumer goods manufacturing company producing home and office furniture as well as window and door frames. Items are sold in the Samara region and across Russia.

Social Responsibility 
In 2014, TogliattiAzot started an initiative to support families raising disabled children in Toylatti. 100 financial grants were made available.

TogliattiAzot has sponsored the annual international environmental congress 'ELPIT' on several years including 2015.

References

External links

 The origins of TogliattiAzot conflict 

Chemical companies of Russia
Chemical companies established in 1974
Buildings and structures in Tolyatti
Tolyatti
Chemical companies of the Soviet Union
Companies based in Samara Oblast